Alà dei Sardi is a comune (municipality) in the Province of Sassari in the Italian region Sardinia, located about  north of Cagliari and about  southwest of Olbia.

Alà dei Sardi borders the following municipalities: Berchidda, Bitti, Buddusò, Monti, Olbia, Oschiri, Padru.

Alà is characterized by a predominant use of Sardinian as everyday language. It is home to the Trofeo Alasport, an annual cross country running event.

History
The ancient origins of Alà dei Sardi are testified by the numerous archaeological findings in the area.

The origin of the name has been connected to both the Balares and the Ilienses, two Sardinian people who lived in the area and had never totally been subdued by the Romans.

The modern Alà appeared in the 16th century, and has since then been traditionally connected to the breeding and agricultural activities. The mining of coal begun in the 19th century.

References

External links

 www.aladeisardi.altervista.org
 History on town from Eliga Alcada

Cities and towns in Sardinia